Denisa Legac is a sex therapist and hypnotherapist from Croatia.

She is the founder of the Croatian Society for Medical Hypnosis, an expert association part of the Croatian association of medical doctors.

She is the founder of the Milton H. Erickson Institute in Zagreb, Croatia, part of the international Milton H. Erickson Foundation.

Jutarnji list has regularly used her as a source on related medical matters.

References

Living people
1975 births
Physicians from Zagreb
Croatian people in health professions
Sexologists